Ophichthus fasciatus is an eel in the family Ophichthidae (worm/snake eels). It was described by Chu Yuan-Ting and Jin Xin-Bo in 1981, originally under the genus Microdonophis. It is a marine, subtropical eel which is known from the northwestern Pacific Ocean, including China and the Peng-hu Islands.

References

fasciatus
Taxa named by Chu Yuan-Ting 
Taxa named by Wu Han-Lin
Taxa named by Jin Xin-Bo
Fish described in 1981